The 26th Oregon Legislative Assembly had its regular session in 1911.

References 

Oregon legislative sessions
1911 in Oregon
1912 in Oregon
1911 U.S. legislative sessions
1912 U.S. legislative sessions